Claycomo is a village in Clay County, Missouri, United States, as part of the Kansas City metropolitan area. Its name is a portmanteau of "Clay County, MO". The population was 1,343 at the 2020 census. Ford Motor Company owns the Kansas City Assembly Plant (KCAP) in Claycomo, which builds the Ford F-150 pickup trucks and Ford Transit vans.

Geography
Claycomo is located at  (39.200507, -94.489404).

Demographics

2010 census
As of the census of 2010, 1,430 people, 672 households, and 369 families resided in the village. The 759 housing units averaged . The racial makeup of the village was 95.1% White, 0.8% African American, 0.4% Native American, 0.6% Asian, 0.1% Pacific Islander, 1.7% from other races, and 1.3% from two or more races. Hispanics or Latinos of any race were 5.0% of the population.

Of the 672 households, 21.1% had children under the age of 18 living with them, 35.7% were married couples living together, 12.4% had a female householder with no husband present, 6.8% had a male householder with no wife present, and 45.1% were not families. About 38.2% of all households were made up of individuals, and 13.1% had someone living alone who was 65 years of age or older. The average household size was 2.13 and the average family size was 2.75.

The median age in the village was 45 years. Around 16.6% of residents were under the age of 18, 8.2% were between the ages of 18 and 24, 25.1% were from 25 to 44, 32.6% were from 45 to 64, and 17.6% were 65 years of age or older. The gender makeup of the village was 52.0% male and 48.0% female.

2000 census
As of the census of 2000, 1,267 people, 596 households, and 345 families resided in the village. The population density was 506.0 people per square mile (195.7/km). 

The median income for a household in the village was $39,271, and for a family was $44,861. Males had a median income of $29,531 versus $23,990 for females. The per capita income for the village was $20,000. About 4.3% of families and 4.7% of the population were below the poverty line, including 10.6% of those under age 18 and 5.7% of those age 65 or over.

Education
North Kansas City School District is the area school district. Gracemore, Maplewood, and Ravenwood elementaries include sections of Claycomo. All of Claycomo is zoned to Maple Park Middle School, and Winnetonka High School.

Claycomo has a public library, a branch of the Mid-Continent Public Library.

References

Villages in Clay County, Missouri
Villages in Missouri